Oman–Russia relations is the bilateral relationship between Russia and Oman. Russia has an embassy in Muscat.  Oman is represented in Russia through its embassy in Moscow. Oman was allied to the west during the Cold War. The Soviet Union supported Marxist rebels like the Popular Front for the Liberation of Oman in Oman during the Dhofar Rebellion in the 1960s and 1970s, resulting in bad relations between Oman and the Soviets. The rebels were crushed with British help by the Omani government. Oman did not maintain relations with the Soviets during this time. After a long period, Oman and the Soviet Union established diplomatic relations on February 5, 1986, and still maintain mostly neutral relations. However, since a breakthrough OPEC deal, Oman and Russia have been active allies in the Persian Gulf.

See also 
 Foreign relations of Russia
 Foreign relations of Oman
Al Sheikh Abdullah bin Zaher bin Saif Al Hussani, Ambassador Extraordinary and Plenipotentiary of the Sultanate of Oman to the Russian Federation

External links 
  Documents on the Oman–Russia relationship at the Russian Ministry of Foreign Affairs

 
Bilateral relations of Russia
Russia